Zbylut is an old Polish given name of Slavic origin built of two parts: zby ("to dispel, to get rid of") and lut ("severe").

List of people with the given name Zbylut

Zbylut Grzywacz, a Polish painter, sculptor, graphic artist, and professor of the Academy of Fine Arts in Kraków
Zbylut Twardowski, a Polish-American physician, known for his pioneering work on dialysis

See also
 Zbylut (disambiguation)
 Zbigniew
 Zbyszko

Polish masculine given names
Slavic masculine given names